Kashi Singh Airy (Hindi: काशी सिंह ऐरी; born 1 June 1953) is the leader and founding member of Uttarakhand Kranti Dal and a former member of the Uttar Pradesh Legislative Assembly and Uttarakhand Legislative Assembly. He founded the party in 1979 along with Bipin Chandra Tripathi, D. D. Pant and Indramani Badoni.

Early life 
Kashi Singh Airy was born on 1 June 1953, in Panthagaon village in Dharchula, Pithoragarh to Kehar Singh and mother Sunita Devi. He had his primary and secondary education at Baluwakot. He passed his intermediate education from GIC Narayan Nagar, Didihat and went to Pithoragarh for graduation, start student leadership, in 1973 he was elected Vice President of student union GPGC Pithoragarh. After completing BSc he went to Nainital to pursue higher studies where he completed his post-graduation in M.Sc. (Botany) and M.A. (Social Science) {Gold medal} from Kumaon University, and received LLB From Lucknow, Uttar Pradesh.

Political career 
As an activist for Uttarakhand Statehood Movement, he founded party Uttarakhand Kranti Dal with Bipin Chandra Tripathi, D. D. Pant and Indramani Badoni in Mussoorie on 25 July 1979. He served as MLA three times in Uttar Pradesh Legislative Assembly (1985–89, 1989–91 and 1993–96) from Didihat assembly constituency and after the creation of new state Uttarakhand on 9 November 2000 (then Uttaranchal) he served as a member in 1st Uttarakhand Legislative Assembly (2002–07) too.

References

1953 births
Living people
People from Pithoragarh district
Uttarakhand Kranti Dal politicians
Members of the Uttarakhand Legislative Assembly